Jean-Baptiste de Santeul (or Santeuil, Santeüil; 12 May 1630 - 5 August 1697) was a French poet who wrote in Latin.

Life

Jean-Baptiste de Santeul was born on 12 May 1630 in Paris, to a good family.
His father was Claude de Santeuil, a bourgeois merchant of Paris. His uncle, Nicolas de Santeuil, was President of the Finance office of Paris, then Intendant of the Department of Beauvais for twenty years.
His mother was Madelaine Boucher. He was one of five children. Three of his brothers, Claude, Charles and Didier, also had distinguished careers.
He was first educated at the College of Clermont. He studied rhetoric under the Jesuit Father Coffard, who discovered his talent for Latin verse.

Jean-Baptiste de Santeul entered the Abbey of St. Victor, Paris, in 1653, and made his profession the next year.
He became a regular canon. He was a respected poet in the Latin language, writing under the name of Santolius Victorinus.
Santeul also wrote hymns, many of which were published in the Cluniac Breviary of 1686, and the Paris Breviaries of 1680 and 1736.
His Hymni Sacri et Novi were published at Paris in 1689. An enlarged version was published in 1698. 
A number of his hymns were translated into English.

De Santeul was the author of the Latin phrase castigat ridendo mores, meaning "laughter corrects customs". 
One of his contemporaries was Giuseppe Biancolelli, a popular actor better known as "Dominique" who specialized in the role of Harlequin.
Dominique managed to obtain the phrase from de Santeul for use as an inscription on his theater.
Since then it has often been engraved on the pediment of theaters.

Jean-Baptiste de Santeul died at Dijon on 5 August 1697 while on a journey.
He was first buried in the church of Saint-Etienne in Dijon, later transported to Paris at the expense of the house of Condé and buried in the Abbey of St-Victor. 
His body was exhumed when that abbey was destroyed during the French Revolution, and taken to the College of Charlemagne.
He was then transferred to the church of Saint-Nicolas-du-Chardonnet, Paris, and placed in the vault of the chapel of St-Esprit on 16 February 1818. 
An epitaph composed by Rollin is on the wall of that chapel.

Hymns

Several of Santeul's hymns were translated into English. They include:
Supreme quales Arbiter (Disposer supreme) translated by Isaac Williams, 1839
Christi perenne nuntii (Christ's everlasting messengers) translated by Isaac Williams
Divine crescebas Puer (The Heavenly Child in stature grows) translated by John Chandler, 1837
Templi sacratas pande Syon fores (O Sion, open wide thy gates) translated by Edward Caswall
Non parta solo sanguine (Not by the martyr's death alone)
O qui ruo, dux martyrum (First of martyrs, Thou whose name)

Bibliography

References
Notes

Citations

Sources

Further reading

1630 births
1697 deaths
French poets
French male poets